Forever is the third studio album by English girl group the Spice Girls, released on 1 November 2000 by Virgin Records. It is their only album without Geri Halliwell, who later rejoined the group for their Greatest Hits album in 2007. Despite failing to match the commercial success of the group's two previous albums, Forever peaked at number two on the UK Albums Chart and was certified Platinum by the British Phonographic Industry (BPI). Worldwide the album has sold over two million copies, a fraction of what  Spice and Spiceworld sold. The lead and only single, the  double A-side "Holler" and "Let Love Lead the Way", went on to debut at number one  on the UK Singles Chart, becoming the group's ninth number one single. Their 1998 Christmas single "Goodbye", released almost two years earlier, was also included on the album as the closer.

Background
During the Spiceworld Tour in early 1998, the group took on an initial project to write and record songs for a possible third album and a live album. The original concept for this album was to showcase solo songs, duets, and cover songs featuring all five members, in order to promote the idea that the Spice Girls were all individuals, yet could come together as one. The girls went to Dublin's Windmill Lane Studios with longtime collaborators Richard Stannard and Matt Rowe to work on a new album and create master recordings for a live album. With the sudden departure of Geri Halliwell, the project took a major turn, with many of the already produced songs scrapped and the live album cancelled.

The Spice Girls recorded their Christmas single, "Goodbye", in July 1998, during the North American leg of their Spiceworld Tour. Once again, the girls teamed up with Stannard and Rowe. They also recorded "My Strongest Suit" for the concept album for the musical Aida. In the two years between the release of "Goodbye" in December 1998 and the release of Forever in November 2000, the group, along with the pop-music landscape in general, changed dramatically. Hoping to cultivate a more mature image, the group teamed up with a team of American producers to give Forever a more R&B sound. However, initial recording sessions maintained the pop sound of their previous works.

The album's title was revealed through a poll on the group's official website, in which fans voted for what they thought the title would be. Forever was picked by 30% of users, whilst 45% went for Third Time Around and 25% voted for Spice 2000. The album leaked on Napster a week prior to its release.

Recording
Recording for the album initially began in mid-1999, and the first tracks recorded for the album were recorded at Abbey Road Studios with Stannard and Rowe. The group continued working on tracks through August and September, working on tracks with Eliot Kennedy at Steelworks Studios and tracks with Rodney Jerkins and Jimmy Jam and Terry Lewis at Whitfield Street Studios respectively. Following these sessions, work on the album was put on a pause. Melanie Chisholm began promoting her first solo album Northern Star, released in October, and the group began preparations for the Christmas in Spiceworld tour, in which they premiered the tracks "Right Back At Ya", "W.O.M.A.N." and "Holler". Following the tour, Chisholm continued to promote Northern Star, and the other members worked on preparing their own solo material. Recording for the album did not resume until April 2000, when further tracks were recorded with Jerkins, followed by the final recording session on 17 July 2000.

Sessions with Stannard and Rowe were eventually scrapped from the album, and Kennedy's only surviving contribution to the album was "Right Back at Ya", included on the album in a re-recorded, remixed, R&B form that Kennedy described as a "plodding, boring, bottom drawer R&B song". In an interview with biographer David Sinclair, Stannard relayed his disappointment in the omission of "W.O.M.A.N.": "I thought that song was really interesting lyrically, because it was making the progression from girls to women, which was something Matt and I thought it was time for them to do. They needed something to suggest that they were still the same group of friends, but they were gaining more maturity." Bunton explained that the song was not included because "the sound [had] moved on" in the time since it was recorded.

Singles
"Goodbye", released as the group's first single without Geri Halliwell on 8 December 1998 in the United States and on 14 December 1998 in the United Kingdom, was included on the album as the eleventh track. "Goodbye" debuted at number one on the UK Singles Chart, becoming the Christmas number one single of 1998, and number 11 on the Billboard Hot 100.

"Holler" and "Let Love Lead the Way" were chosen to serve as the official lead single from Forever. Released as a double A-side single, it debuted at number one on the UK Singles Chart and became the Spice Girls' ninth number-one single in the United Kingdom. It also peaked in the top 10 in nine other countries. 

"Tell Me Why", "Weekend Love", and "If You Wanna Have Some Fun" were released as promotional singles in November 2000. "Tell Me Why" had several commissioned remixes, only one of which was commercially released as a bonus track seven years later on the deluxe edition of Greatest Hits. An official promotional montage video was released for "If You Wanna Have Some Fun" in November 2000.

Promotion
The Spice Girls performed "Holler" and "Let Love Lead the Way" at the 2000 MTV Europe Music Awards, Top of the Pops, the National Lottery show and CD:UK, as well as appearing for interviews on Live & Kicking and TFI Friday.

During the album's promotion, the group divided to cover more ground. Melanie Brown promoted Forever and her solo album Hot in the UK and Japan, while Melanie Chisholm was in the middle of her European tour. Emma Bunton and Victoria Beckham promoted Forever in the United States by appearing on Showbiz Today, The Daily Show, Entertainment Tonight, and attending the VH1 Vogue Fashion Awards. Archived footage of Bunton and Beckham's appearance at the VH1 Vogue Fashion Awards was used in the film Zoolander.

Melanie Brown hinted at a possible tour to promote Forever in October 2000. She said, "We're going to tour next year and everything will be hunky dory." She also stated that tour would be global including dates in America as well. The tour was cancelled due to their solo projects.

The Spice Girls did not heavily promote Forever as much as their previous albums, and the promotional campaign was ceased in December 2000 as the group went on an indefinite hiatus. The following month, Emma Bunton officially stated that "the record seems to have come to a natural end. I want to concentrate on solo projects and there is no time to release a single now. All our individual projects are scheduled and we wouldn't have time for any promotion."

Critical reception

Forever received mixed reviews from music critics. At Metacritic, which assigns a normalised rating out of 100 to reviews from mainstream publications, the album received an average score of 45, based on nine reviews. Stephen Thomas Erlewine of AllMusic wrote that on Forever, the Spice Girls "make all the right moves, hiring superstar producer Rodney Jerkins to helm most of the tracks and attempting to seem mature, but this all results in a record that is curiously self-conscious and flat", concluding, "Forever plays like the Girls realized that it's their final album, and they put in just enough effort to make it palatable, but not enough to make it appetizing." Michael Paoletta of Billboard gave the album a positive review, stating it "oozes with timely funk beats and the kind of well-crafted songs that No. 1 hits are made of." Andrew Lynch from entertainment.ie opined, "The production is as slick as ever, but a huge part of that old Girl Power enthusiasm seems to have drained and fallen away—and with it most of the fun that used to redeem their fundamental tackiness. A sorry, full-hearted footnote to a truly remarkable pop phenomenon."

In a mixed review, James Hunter of Rolling Stone expressed that "Forever will probably provoke a reaction somewhere in the middle—with one exception, it's just OK." David Browne of Entertainment Weekly commented, "Every genre cliché, from homogenized harmonies to delicately plucked stringed instruments to male rapper interjections, is securely in place. The music is so tasteful, restrained, and assembly line proficient that it makes early singles like 'Say You'll Be There' sound like the rawest punk rock." The Sonic Net review stated, "Yes, this is their 'mature' album, the one where the once effervescent combo that could be counted on for enough hooky innuendoes to excite pre-teen girls and dirty young men alike aspire toward some sort of longer-lasting pop relevance. Which translates here into ballads and a huge dose of R&B-lite. It all sounds very professional, though only a hardcore fan can deny that the bloom is definitely off the rose."

Commercial performance
In the United Kingdom, Forever was released the same week as Westlife's Coast to Coast album and the chart battle was widely reported by the media, where Westlife won the battle reaching number one on the UK Albums Chart, leaving the Spice Girls at number two selling 71,000 copies in its first week. Forever spent a total of 10 weeks on the chart. It was certified Platinum by the British Phonographic Industry (BPI) on 17 November 2000, denoting shipments in excess of 300,000 copies. In the United States the album achieved moderate success; it peaked at number 39 on the Billboard 200, lower than their previous album Spiceworld (1997), which peaked at number three, the album only lasted 7 weeks on the charts and by July 2006, it had sold 207,000 copies. Forever has sold two million copies worldwide.

In Australia it peaked at number nine, and was certified Gold there. The album reached number 10 in Austria, and was also certified Gold there. In Canada it peaked at number six, and was certified double Platinum there making it the highest certification for Forever. The album also peaked at number six in Germany, but was certified Gold there. In Ireland it reached a peak at number 15. The album reached number 25 on the charts in New Zealand, where it was certified Gold. In Switzerland it peaked at number 11, and was certified Platinum.

Track listing

Notes
  signifies a vocal producer
  signifies an additional vocal producer
  signifies a remixer

Personnel
Credits adapted from the liner notes of Forever.

Musicians
 Eliot Kennedy – backing vocals 
 Sue Drake – backing vocals 
 Jimmy Jam and Terry Lewis – arrangement, all musical instruments 
 Wil Malone – strings arrangement 
 Paul Waller – drum programming

Technical

 Rodney Jerkins – production, mixing 
 LaShawn "The Big Shiz" Daniels – vocal production 
 Harvey Mason Jr. – Pro Tools ; production 
 Brad Gilderman – recording, mixing 
 Dave Russell – recording assistance 
 Ian Robertson – recording assistance 
 Paul Foley – recording 
 Ben Garrison – mixing ; recording 
 Fred Jerkins III – production (as Uncle Freddie) ; mixing 
 Eliot Kennedy – additional vocal production 
 Sue Drake – additional vocal production 
 Robert Smith – production 
 Jimmy Jam and Terry Lewis – production 
 Steve Hodge – engineering, mixing 
 Brad Yost – engineering assistance, mixing assistance 
 Xavier Smith – engineering assistance, mixing assistance 
 Tony Salter – vocal engineering 
 Richard Stannard – production 
 Matt Rowe – production 
 Adrian Bushby – engineering 
 Jake Davies – engineering assistance 
 Mark "Spike" Stent – mixing 
 Paul Walton – mixing assistance 
 Jan Kybert – mixing assistance 
 Bernie Grundman – mastering at Bernie Grundman Mastering (Los Angeles)

Artwork
 Terry Richardson – photography
 Vince Frost – design

Charts

Weekly charts

Year-end charts

Certifications and sales

Release history

References

Bibliography
 

2000 albums
Albums produced by Harvey Mason Jr.
Albums produced by Jimmy Jam and Terry Lewis
Albums produced by Richard Stannard (songwriter)
Albums produced by Rodney Jerkins
Spice Girls albums
Virgin Records albums